Malte Kiilerich Hansen (born 16 October 1995) is a Danish professional footballer who plays for AC Horsens.

References

Living people
1995 births
Association football forwards
Danish men's footballers
FC Midtjylland players
Brønshøj Boldklub players
Hvidovre IF players
AC Horsens players
Danish Superliga players
Danish 1st Division players
Danish 2nd Division players